The Association of Christian Philosophers of India (ACPI) was founded in 1976 at Aluva, Kerala, India under the inspiration of Dr Richard De Smet, SJ and the initiative of Dr Albert Nambiaparambil, CMI.

Activities 
The chief activity is the annual meeting, held at different places in India, with a topic chosen a year in advance and papers presented largely by the members. Since 2000, the association has begun publishing the proceedings of its annual meetings (see below, Publications). Earlier, papers were published through Journal of Dharma, Divyadaan: Journal of Philosophy and Education, or other such journals.

Originally, the association would meet at the same venue as the Indian Philosophical Congress; members would join the IPC, and then hold their own meetings. Eventually, the decision was made to hold meetings independently of the IPC.

Membership is open to any Christian holding a doctorate or a master's degree in philosophy or related subjects, or even holding a teaching post in some institute of higher learning.

A recent major activity was the publication of the ACPI Encyclopedia of Philosophy.

Publications 
 The Postmodern ... A Siege of the Citadel of Reason
 Faith, Reason, Science: Philosophical Reflections with Special Reference to 'Fides et Ratio'. Ed. Varghese Manimala. Delhi: Media House, 2003.
 The Constitution of India: A Philosophical Review. Ed. George Panthanmackel
 Truth, Power, Money: A Postmodern Reading
 Philosophical Methods: Through the Prevalent to a Relevant
 Subaltern Perspectives: Philosophizing in Context
 Pluralism of Pluralism: A Pluralistic Probe into Philosophizing
 Romancing the Sacred: Towards an Indian Christian Philosophy of Religion
 Culture as Gift and Task: Philosophical Reflections in the Indian Context. Ed. Keith D'Souza
 Enigma of Indian Tribal Life and Culture: Philosophical Investigations. Ed. Vincent Aind
 Violence and its Victims: A Challenge to Philosophizing in the Indian Context. Ed. Ivo Coelho. Bangalore: Asian Trading Corporation, 2010.
 Tradition and Innovation: Philosophy of Rootedness and Openness. Ed. Saju Chacklackal. Bangalore: Asian Trading Corporation, 2011.

In 2010, the association published the ACPI Encyclopedia of Philosophy, eds Johnson J. Puthenpurackal and George Panthanmackel. Bangalore: Asian Trading Corporation, 2010.

References 

Christian organisations based in India